Bastrop High School is a senior high school in Bastrop, Louisiana, United States. It is a part of the Morehouse Parish School Board.

History
In 2006 Bastrop High had an undefeated American football team season, but on August 28, 2006, the Louisiana High School Athletic Association removed the school's title, arguing that it had improperly contacted and transported players from Port Sulphur, Louisiana who had been displaced by Hurricane Katrina.

Prayer controversy 
In 2011, graduating senior Damon Fowler objected to prayer at the Bastrop High School graduation exercises, claiming a looming violation of the First Amendment to the Constitution of the United States. The ACLU of Louisiana asked the school not to include a prayer in the May 20 graduation. At the Thursday night rehearsal for the graduation, senior Sarah Barlow included a prayer that explicitly mentioned Jesus, and during the graduation, student Laci Rae Mattice led people in the Lord's Prayer before a moment of silence. The school says that Mattice was told not to include a prayer. Fowler stated that after his objections became public he was ostracized by other students.

Athletics
Bastrop High School competes in the Louisiana High School Athletic Association.  They won the football state championships in 1927, 2006, and 2007.

Notable alumni
 Denzel Devall, (Class of 2012), personnel assistant for Alabama Crimson Tide football
 Dan Johnson, (Class of 1979) pastor and politician
 Brain Jones, (Class of 2000), former professional football player
 Carl Kilpatrick, former professional basketball player
 Calvin Natt, former professional basketball player
 Kenny Natt, former professional basketball player
 Rueben Randle, (Class of 2009) professional football player
 Claude Wroten, former professional football player

Notable faculty
 Leon Barmore, head basketball coach from 1967 to 1971, Louisiana Tech Lady Techsters head coach from 1985 to 2002

References

Note
 Some text originated from Morehouse Parish School Board

External links
 Bastrop High School

Public high schools in Louisiana
Education in Morehouse Parish, Louisiana